Reynaldo Sietecase is an Argentine journalist. He works at the TV news Telefe Noticias, and won the 2013 Tato award for best journalist work.

Awards

Nominations
 2013 Martín Fierro Awards
 Best male journalist

References

Argentine journalists
Male journalists
People from Rosario, Santa Fe
1961 births
Living people